Brandon Hamilton, professionally known as Blue, is a Grammy Award nominated American record producer from Atlanta, Georgia, United States. He is most known for his work with Plumbline Music Group, which he joined in January 2010.

Blue is signed with Plumbline Music Group, a music production company started by Jan Smith. He has worked with Jan on the production of the Grammy-nominated Diane Warren song written for Justin Bieber entitled "Born To Be Somebody". This also earned Blue production credits on the film, Justin Bieber: Never Say Never and was the only new release from the movie's soundtrack CD. Blue also co-wrote a song with Justin Bieber entitled "All I Want is You" for the 2011 Christmas album, Under The Mistletoe.

In June 2012, Blue landed a cover and was named Atlanta's Hottest New Producer and one to watch for in X-Poszed magazine.

Production and writing credits 
Justin Bieber - Under the Mistletoe (November 1, 2011)
 "All I Want Is You"
(Produced By Justin Bieber, Written By Justin Bieber, Brandon Blue Hamilton)

Justin Bieber - Never Say Never: The Remixes (February 14, 2011)
 "Born to Be Somebody" - from the film, Justin Bieber: Never Say Never. A Grammy Award nominated song.
(Produced By Brandon Blue Hamilton, Jan Smith, Written By Dianne Warren)

Myron Butler & Levi - Stronger (August 28, 2007)
(Guitar and additional personnel – Brandon Blue Hamilton)

Personal life 
Despite widespread confusion, this Atlanta-based African-American record producer, Brandon "Blue" Hamilton, is not the same individual as a Los Angeles-based white musician named Blue Hamilton, who is married to actor Matt Dallas.

References

External links 
 

1987 births
Living people
Record producers from California
Record producers from Georgia (U.S. state)